G-Unit Films and Television Inc. is an American film and television production company founded by rapper 50 Cent in 2003. In 2008, 50 Cent created an independent film production company with Randall Emmett called Cheetah Vision, thus scrapping G-Unit Films. In 2010, Jackson revived G-Unit Films, renaming the company to G-Unit Films and Television Inc. In over 18 months, Jackson has sold projects to six different networks. Among them was Power, a Starz drama for which Jackson serves as a co‐star, co-creator, and executive television producer. Jackson signed a two-year contract with Starz, with representation coming from the Agency for the Performing Arts. Ratings have been a success for Starz.

Past and current productions

Films
50 Cent: The New Breed (2003)
50 Cent: The Massacre - Special Edition (2005)
The Game: Documentary (2005)
Get Rich or Die Tryin' (2005)
Blood Out (2010)
Setup (2011)
Freelancers (2012)
Fire with Fire (2012)
The Frozen Ground (2013)
Den of Thieves 2 (TBA)

Television
Dream School (2013)
Power (2014–2020)
50 Central (2017)
The Oath (2017–2019)
For Life (2020–2021)
Power Book II: Ghost (2020-present)
Power Book III: Raising Kanan (2021-present)
Black Mafia Family (2021-present)
Power Book IV: Force (2022-present)

References

2003 establishments in New York City
50 Cent
Companies based in New York City
Mass media companies established in 2003
Film production companies of the United States
Television production companies of the United States
Disney XD